When I Die may refer to:

"When I Die" (Motherlode song), 1969
"When I Die" (No Mercy song), 1996
"Texas (When I Die)", a song by Tanya Tucker, 1978
"When I Die", a song by Alma, 2019
"When I Die", a song by Beirut from Gallipoli, 2019
"When I Die", a song by New Found Glory from Coming Home, 2006
"When I Die", a song by the Waifs from Sink or Swim, 2000

See also
"And When I Die", a song by Blood, Sweat and Tears, 1969